Gerald John O'Hara (born 3 December 1956) is an English former professional footballer who played in the Football League, as a midfielder.

References

Sources

1956 births
Living people
Footballers from Wolverhampton
English footballers
Association football midfielders
Wolverhampton Wanderers F.C. players
Hereford United F.C. players
Worcester City F.C. players
English Football League players